The following is a list of Israeli  dishes. For the cuisine, see Israeli  cuisine.

Main dishes

Meat
Jerusalem mixed grill—originating in Jerusalem, a mixed grill of chicken hearts, spleens and liver mixed with bits of lamb cooked on a flat grill, seasoned with a spice blend and served with rice, mujaddara or bamia
Kubba seleq—stew or soup made of beet
Merguez—a spicy sausage originating in North Africa, mainly eaten grilled in Israel
Moussaka—oven-baked layered ground-meat and eggplant casserole
Schnitzel—fried chicken breast with breadcrumb or spice-flavored flour coating
Shashlik—skewered and grilled cubes of meat
Skewered goose liver—flavored with spices

Fish

Denesse—in the coastal region, baked with yogurt, tomatoes, garlic, dried mint and cucumbers; also prepared fried
Gefilte fish—traditional Ashkenazi Jewish quenelles made of carp, whitefish, or pike, typically eaten as an appetizer
Tilapia—St. Peter's fish, eaten in Israel and especially in Tiberias fried or baked with spices

Vegetarian

Brik—thin pastry around a filling, commonly deep fried
Burgul—wheat, cooked in many ways
Hamin—long-cooked Shabbat stews made with a variety of meats, grains and root vegetables
Jakhnun—pastry served on Shabbat morning with fresh grated tomato and skhug, eaten for breakfast especially on Shabbat
Khachapuri—bread filled with eggs and cheese
Kishka—stuffed derma, typically cooked in Shabbat stews
Ktzitzot Khubeza—a patty made of mallow, bulgur/bread crumbs, eggs, onion, olive oil
Kubba bamia—dumplings made of semolina or rice and okra cooked in a tomato stew or soup
Macaroni Hamin—a traditional Sephardic Jerusalemite dish, originally from the Jewish Quarter of the Old City of Jerusalem
Malawach—bread eaten with fresh grated tomato and skhug
Orez Shu'it—white beans cooked in a tomato stew and served on rice
Ptitim—toasted pasta shaped like rice grains
Ziva—puff pastry topped with sesame seeds and filled with cheese and olives

Soups

Maraq 'Adashim—lentil soup cooked with tomato sauce
Maraq Shuit—white-bean soup cooked with tomato sauce
Matzah ball—dropped into a pot of salted boiling water or chicken soup, a staple food on Passover.
Shkedei marak—small yellow squares made from flour and palm oil.

Meze 

Bourekas—phyllo or puff pastry filled with vegetables, cheese, meat, spices, herbs, nuts, pickles, etc. (comes from börek)
Kreplach—small dumplings filled with ground meat, mashed potatoes or another filling, usually boiled and served in chicken soup, though they may also be served fried.

Salads and dips 

Cabbage salad
Carrot salad
Coleslaw
Greek salad
Hamusim—vegetables pickled in a pot, such as cucumber and cabbage, eggplant, carrot, turnip, radish, onion, caper, lemon, olives, cauliflower, tomatoes, chili, bell pepper, garlic and beans
Israeli salad—made with tomatoes, cucumbers, onions, parsley
Matbucha—cooked dish of tomatoes and roasted bell peppers seasoned with garlic and chili pepper
Salat avocado—rural salad made of avocados, with lemon juice and chopped scallions
Salat ḥatzilim b'mayonnaise—contains fried eggplant, mayonnaise, garlic
Sabich salad—rural salad dish, the ingredients are almost the same as in sabich itself without the hummus and pita bread

Cheeses and yogurts 

Cottage cheese
Circassian cheese—a mild cheese that does not melt when baked or fried, and can be crumbled
Feta cheese
Gvina levana—Israeli quark cheese, sold in different fat content variations (1-2%, 3%, 5% and 9%)
Milky—yogurt with chocolate pudding, vanilla whipped-cream and other variations
Sirene—a type of brined cheese made in the Balkans
Tzfat cheese—semi-hard salty sheep milk cheese

Spices and condiments 

Ras el hanout—used in many savory dishes, sometimes rubbed on meat or fish, or stirred into couscous, pasta or rice
Sumac—dried fruits are ground to produce a tangy, crimson spice
Hawaij—a variety of Yemeni ground spice mixtures
Filfel chuma—a chili-garlic paste similar to a hot sauce originating from Libyan Jews
Skhug—the hot sauce of choice in the Middle East, made from chili peppers, cilantro, and various spices, red or green, depending on the color of the chilis
Amba—tangy mango pickle condiment of Iraqi-Jewish and Kurdish-Jewish origin

Breads

Breads 

Bagel—a ring of yeasted wheat dough, roughly hand-sized, first boiled for a short time in water and then baked 
Challah—a special bread of Eastern-European origin in Ashkenazi Jewish cuisine, usually braided
Kubaneh—traditional Yemenite Jewish bread similar to monkey bread
Malawach—thin layers of puff pastry brushed with oil or fat and cooked flat in a frying panMatzah—an unleavened flatbreadMofletta—a thin crêpe made from water, flour and oil
Sliced bread—less common today

 Bread dishes 

Bagel toast
Falafel in pita–Israeli pita stuffed with falafel balls and Israeli saladHavita b'laffa—omelette in taboon bread, served with hummus or labnehJerusalem mixed grill—can be served in pita or laffaLahmacun—round, thin piece of dough topped with minced meat (most commonly beef and lamb) and minced vegetables and herbs including onions, tomatoes and parsley, then bakedSabich—served in pita, traditionally containing fried eggplant, hard-boiled eggs, hummus, tahini, Israeli salad, potato, parsley and amba. Traditionally it is made with haminados eggs. Sometimes it is doused with hot sauce and sprinkled with minced onion
Tunisian sandwich—warm sandwich with tuna, hard-boiled egg, potato, harissa and olives

 Snacks 

Bamba—a peanut-butter-flavored snack
Bissli—popular flavors are "Grill" and "Barbecue", others include onion, smoky, pizza, falafel, Mexican, and hamburgerBourekas—a popular baked pastry
Cow Chocolate—a brand of chocolate products Frikandel—a sort of minced-meat hot dog
Klik—various chocolate, candy, and chocolate-covered products, including chocolate-covered corn flakes and malted milk balls
Krembo—a chocolate-coated marshmallow treatMekupelet—a bar of thinly folded milk chocolatePannekoek special—pancake or crêpe filled with Nutella chocolate spread and banana
Pesek Zman—brand of chocolate barSufganiyah—a round jelly doughnutSfenj—a light, spongy ring of dough fried in oil, eaten plain, sprinkled with sugar, or soaked in honeyTortit—a wafer coated with chocolate containing rum-like almond cream

 Sweets and desserts Fazuelos—Sephardic pastries of thin fried doughHamantash—an Ashkenazi triangular filled-pocket cookie
Ice cream—ice creams, ice pops, and sorbets come in many flavors including halva, hummus, Bamba, arak, watermelon, sirene, labane, and za'atarKrantz cake—variations include one filled with chocolate and raspberry jam, another soaked in honey syrupKugel—a baked pudding or casserole, most commonly made from egg noodlesLahoh—a spongy, pancake-like bread originating from Somalia and the Horn of AfricaLekach—a honey-sweetened cakeLevivot—Hanukah latkes (potato pancakes)
 Pannekoek special—pancake or crêpe filled with Nutella chocolate spread and bananaRugelach—a triangle of dough around a fillingSilan—date honey
Watermelon with sirene or safed cheese, and sometimes mint leaves

 Beverages 

Apricot juiceArak—Anise-flavored alcoholic beverage, sometimes flavored with grapefruit or khat juices instead of water
BeerGat—A juice made of khat, in Jerusalem it is mixed with citron and named EtrogatLimonana''—type of lemonade made from freshly-squeezed lemon juice and mint leaves
Orange juice
Pomegranate juice
Pomegranate wine
Shoko Bsakit—chocolate milk in a bag
Sugarcane juice
Tea—sometimes flavored with rosewater, mint, lemon juice, honey or date honey
Turkish coffee
Vodka—distilled beverage composed primarily of water and ethanol, sometimes with traces of impurities and flavorings
Wine

Other 
Israeli breakfast

See also 

 Israeli cuisine
 Kosher restaurant
 Middle Eastern cuisine
 Strauss-Elite
 Osem (company)

References

Lists of foods by nationality
Dishes